Joshua Lewis and Reva Shayne Lewis are fictional characters and one of the signature supercouples from the American CBS daytime drama Guiding Light. Josh is played by Robert Newman and Reva is played by Kim Zimmer. The popular couple has been nicknamed the portmanteau name "Jeva" (for Josh and Reva) on internet message boards.

See also 
List of supercouples

References

External links
SoapCentral

Guiding Light characters
Soap opera supercouples